Admiral Ehrensvärd may refer to:

Carl August Ehrensvärd (1745–1800), Swedish Navy general admiral
Carl August Ehrensvärd (1858–1944) (1858–1944), Swedish Navy admiral
Gösta Ehrensvärd (1885–1973) was a Swedish Navy vice admiral